Sathenahalli is a small village in Hassan district of India.

Location
Sathenahalli lies on the Mysore - Arsikere highway. It comes under Channarayapatna taluk of Hassan district in Karnataka state, India.

Economy
The village is completely agrarian in nature. In 2015, the village recorded the highest rainfall in the region.

Postal code
There is a post office in the village and the PIN code is 573212.

Image gallery

See also
 Shravanabelagola
 Shravaneri
 Munjenahalli
 Gandasi Handpost
 Mududi

References

Villages in Hassan district